William Cecil Gibson Patrick (12 March 1932 in Lochgelly – 18 April 2003) was a Scottish footballer.  He played professionally for Coventry City and Gillingham between 1954 and 1960.

References

1932 births
2003 deaths
Scottish footballers
Gillingham F.C. players
Coventry City F.C. players
People from Lochgelly
Association football defenders
English Football League players
Footballers from Fife